
Gmina Łukowica is a rural gmina (administrative district) in Limanowa County, Lesser Poland Voivodeship, in southern Poland.

In 2008 Łukowica was selected along with 19 other European villages in Germany, Poland, Italy and Spain for the Spanish documentary Film "Villages of Europe" (Pueblos de Europa), produced by Juan Frutos (Colours Communication Group) and Orange Productions S.L.

According to the Ministry of Finance, as of 2014 Łukowica was the poorest gmina in Poland.

Villages
Gmina Łukowica contains the villages of Jadamwola, Jastrzębie, Łukowica, Młyńczyska, Owieczka, Przyszowa, Roztoka, Stronie, Świdnik

Neighbouring gminas
Gmina Łukowica is bordered by the gminas of Kamienica, Łącko, Limanowa and Podegrodzie.

References

 Polish official population figures 2006

Lukowica
Limanowa County